Alexis René Glabach (born November 23, 1996), known professionally as Alexis Ren, is an American social media personality, actress, entrepreneur, environmental and mental health activist, and model.

Early life
On November 23, 1996, Ren was born Alexis René Glabach in Santa Monica, California, where she grew up and was homeschooled. She has three sisters and one younger brother.

Career

Modeling

At 13, Ren became a model for the label Brandy Melville. She became a social media personality at 15, when photos of her in a black string bikini posing by the pool went viral on Tumblr. Since then she has appeared in a series of advertisements for the mobile game Final Fantasy XV: A New Empire. She launched an activewear line called Ren Active. Ren was named a Sports Illustrated Swimsuit 2018 Rookie of the year. On September 12, 2018, Ren was announced as one of the celebrities who would compete on season 27 of Dancing with the Stars. Her professional partner was Alan Bersten. Ren and Bersten reached the finals and came in fourth place on November 19, 2018.

Ren was Maxims cover girl for the August 2017 issue, Maxims Mexico cover girl for the March 2018 issue, and Sports Illustrated Swimsuit Issue Rookie for 2018. She was included in Maxim's Hot 100 list of Sexiest Women in the World in 2019.

In October 2019, she starred as "Scarlet Jones" in the music video for Ed Sheeran's "South of the Border". Previously she also featured in the music video for Kygo's "Not Ok".

Ren is the founder of a management company in Japan, Meissa Inc.  She was also featured in Forbes and Vogue.

YouTube
In September 2017, Ren uploaded her first video on YouTube channel, which has more than one million subscribers. Her second video, "10 minute ab workout" is her most viewed video to date with more than 50 million views. Across her social media accounts, she has more than 20 million followers to date.

She uploaded her first music cover in April 2020 on her YouTube Channel.

Entrepreneurship
Ren founded We Are Warriors (WAW) in 2021, an online education hub for mental health, wellness, and fitness. With 20 million followers on social media, she saw the need to bring community and connection to women during the beginning of the COVID-19 pandemic. Initially Ren built a community over direct messages online which then transitioned to monthly challenges over the video communication software, Zoom. Ren's goals for WAW are "to empower young women to transform their mind through a 360-degree approach, including fitness, education, journaling, and meditation".

In April 2022, Ren announced Sirens, a women-led community built on top of the Solana blockchain that supports mental health, education, and eco-friendly living. The project attracted over 10,000 members within the first couple of months in a Discord community built through NFTs.

According to Forbes' Derick David, Ren said that her passion for mental wellness inspired the creation of We Are Warriors and Sirens and that her mother has been a key influence in guiding her on this journey.

Personal life
Her mother, a health nutritionist expert, died in 2014 due to breast cancer. Following the death of her mother, Ren developed an eating disorder, which she later opened up about, saying she was in "a toxic state of mind".

In her free time she enjoys ballet, singing and travelling. She mentioned that she went to ballet classes in her childhood and aspires to continue doing ballet into adulthood. Ren often posts about her travels on her Instagram and Youtube. Ren also enjoys fitness.

Ren dated travel influencer and surfer Jay Alvarrez from 2015 to 2016. She dated Cameron Fegreus while visiting Michigan from 2017 to 2018. She confirmed a romance with her dance partner Alan Bersten from October 2018 to December 2018 while filming the 27th season of Dancing with the Stars. Ren was in a relationship with actor and model Noah Centineo from March 2019 to January 2020.

Filmography
Film

Music videos

Dancing with the Stars (Season 27 Performances)

References

External links
 
 
 

1996 births
American female models
American Internet celebrities
Living people
People from Santa Monica, California
21st-century American women